Christos Giagos (born January 23, 1990) is an American professional mixed martial artist who competes in the Lightweight division in the Ultimate Fighting Championship (UFC).

Background
Giagos was born and raised in Southern California. Giagos competed in wrestling in high school, and began training in mixed martial arts at the age 19 in 2009. He is a Greek American.

Mixed martial arts career

Early career
Giagos made his professional mixed martial arts debut in 2009 competing as a lightweight primarily in regional promotions across California. He was able to compile a record of 10–2, including winning the RFA Lightweight Championship on August 22, 2014 with a TKO stoppage of Dakota Cochrane. On the heels of that victory, Giagos signed with the UFC in the fall of 2014.

Ultimate Fighting Championship
Giagos made his promotional debut against Gilbert Burns on October 25, 2014 at UFC 179. He lost the bout via submission in the first round.

Giagos faced Jorge de Oliveira on March 21, 2015 at UFC Fight Night 62. Giagos won the fight via submission in the first round.

Giagos faced Chris Wade on June 6, 2015 at UFC Fight Night 68. He lost the fight by unanimous decision and was subsequently released from the promotion.

Absolute Championship Berkut
He made his debut in Russia promotion against Alexandre Pimentel of Brazil at ACB 51: Silva vs. Torgeson on January 13, 2017. He won the fight unanimous decision.

In the second match he will make fight against Shamil Nikaev at ACB 71: Yan vs. Mattos on September 30, 2017. He lost the back-and-forth fight by split decision.

Return to UFC
On the heels of a 4–2 run on the regional circuit, Giagos made his return to the promotion against Charles Oliveira on September 22, 2018 at UFC Fight Night 137. He lost the fight via a submission in the second round. “I felt like when I came in the Oliveira fight, I was actually performing very well. I was actually really excited with my performance. I wish I opened up a little more. But, I was a little nervous of the takedown. This guy’s jiu jitsu is just next level, he holds the most submissions. I felt like I was doing really well. Everyone had me winning the first round." Giagos said of his performance after the fight.

Giagos faced Mizuto Hirota on December 2, 2018 at UFC Fight Night 142. He won the fight via unanimous decision.

Giagos faced Damir Hadžović on June 1, 2019 at UFC Fight Night 153. He won the fight via unanimous decision.

Giagos faced Drakkar Klose on August 17, 2019 at UFC 241. He lost the back-and-forth fight via unanimous decision.

Giagos was expected to face Alan Patrick on April 25, 2020. However, he was pulled from the fight citing injury and he was replaced by Frank Camacho.

Giagos replaced Rick Glenn and faced Carlton Minus at UFC Fight Night: Thompson vs. Neal on December 19, 2020. Giagos won the fight via unanimous decision.

Giagos was scheduled to face Joel Álvarez on May 15, 2021 at UFC 262. However, Álvarez was removed from the bout in early May due to alleged visa issues that restricted his travel. Giagos faced returning veteran Sean Soriano. He won the bout via D'arce choke in the second round. This win earned Giagos the Performance of the Night bonus award.

Giagos faced Arman Tsarukyan on September 18, 2021 at UFC Fight Night 192. He lost the fight via technical knockout in round one.

Giagos faced Thiago Moisés at UFC on ESPN 38 on June 25, 2022. He lost the fight via a rear-naked choke submission in the first round.

Giagos was scheduled to face Benoît Saint-Denis on September 3, 2022 at UFC Fight Night 209.  However, Giagos pulled out in early August after severing a tendon of his little finger during a domestic accident.

Giagos  is scheduled to face Ricky Glenn on April 22, 2023, at UFC Fight Night 222.

Personal life
Besides training at Systems Training Center, Giagos coaches CrossFit and kickboxing there. Giagos also teaches strength and conditioning at Systems Training Center. He is also an avid ten-pin bowler.

Championships and achievements

Mixed martial arts
 Ultimate Fighting Championship
 Performance of the Night (One time) vs. Sean Soriano.
Tachi Palace Fights
Tachi Palace Fights Lightweight Championship (one time; former)
Resurrection Fighting Alliance
Resurrection Fighting Alliance Lightweight Championship (one time; former)

Mixed martial arts record

|-
|Loss
|align=center|19–10
|Thiago Moisés
|Submission (rear-naked choke)
|UFC on ESPN: Tsarukyan vs. Gamrot
|
|align=center|1
|align=center|3:05
|Las Vegas, Nevada, United States
|
|-
|Loss
|align=center|19–9
|Arman Tsarukyan
|TKO (punches)
|UFC Fight Night: Smith vs. Spann 
|
|align=center|1
|align=center|2:09
|Las Vegas, Nevada, United States
|
|-
|Win
|align=center|19–8
|Sean Soriano
|Technical Submission (brabo choke)
|UFC 262
|
|align=center|2
|align=center|0:59
|Houston, Texas, United States
|
|-
|Win
|align=center|18–8
|Carlton Minus
|Decision (unanimous)
|UFC Fight Night: Thompson vs. Neal 
|
|align=center|3
|align=center|5:00
|Las Vegas, Nevada, United States
|
|-
|Loss
|align=center|17–8
|Drakkar Klose
|Decision (unanimous)
|UFC 241 
|
|align=center|3
|align=center|5:00
|Anaheim, California, United States
|
|-
|Win
|align=center|17–7
|Damir Hadžović
|Decision (unanimous)
|UFC Fight Night: Gustafsson vs. Smith 
|
|align=center|3
|align=center|5:00
|Stockholm, Sweden
|
|-
|Win
|align=center|16–7
|Mizuto Hirota
|Decision (unanimous)
|UFC Fight Night: dos Santos vs. Tuivasa 
|
|align=center|3
|align=center|5:00
|Adelaide, Australia
| 
|-
|Loss
|align=center|15–7
|Charles Oliveira
|Submission (rear-naked choke)
|UFC Fight Night: Santos vs. Anders 
|
|align=center|2
|align=center|3:22
|São Paulo, Brazil
|
|-
|Win
|align=center|15–6
|Herdeson Batista
|Decision (unanimous)
|ACB 82
|
|align=center|3
|align=center|5:00
|São Paulo, Brazil
|
|-
|Loss
|align=center|14–6
|Shamil Nikaev
|Decision (split)
|ACB 71
|
|align=center|3
|align=center|5:00
|Moscow, Russia
|
|-
|Win
|align=center|14–5
|Alexandre Pimentel
|Decision (unanimous)
|ACB 51
|
|align=center|3
|align=center|5:00
|Irvine, California, United States
|
|-
|Win
|align=center|13–5
|Arthur Estrázulas
|Decision (unanimous)
|RFA 42: Giagos vs. Estrázulas
|
|align=center|3
|align=center|5:00
|Visalia, California, United States
|
|-
|Win
|align=center|12–5
|Karen Darabedyan 
|TKO (punches)
|RFA 38: Moises vs. Emmers
|
|align=center|1
|align=center|1:42
|Costa Mesa, California, United States
|
|-
|Loss
|align=center|11–5
|Josh Emmett
|TKO (punches)
|West Coast FC 16
|
|align=center|3
|align=center|2:21
|Sacramento, California, United States
|
|-
|Loss
|align=center|11–4
|Chris Wade
|Decision (unanimous)
|UFC Fight Night: Boetsch vs. Henderson
|
|align=center|3
|align=center|5:00
|New Orleans, Louisiana, United States
|
|-
|Win
|align=center|11–3
|Jorge de Oliveira
|Submission (rear-naked choke)
|UFC Fight Night: Maia vs. LaFlare
|
|align=center|1
|align=center|3:12
|Rio de Janeiro, Brazil
|
|-
|Loss
|align=center|10–3
|Gilbert Burns
|Submission (armbar)
|UFC 179
|
|align=center|1
|align=center|4:57
|Rio de Janeiro, Brazil
|
|-
|Win
|align=center|10–2
|Dakota Cochrane
|TKO (flying knee and punches)
|RFA 17
|
|align=center|2
|align=center|2:04
|Sioux Falls, South Dakota, United States
|
|-
|Win
|align=center|9–2
|Sevak Magakian
|Submission (triangle choke) 
|TPF 19: Thowback Thursday
|
|align=center|1
|align=center|4:45
|Lemoore, California, United States
|
|-
|Win
|align=center|8–2
|Preston Scharf
|TKO (doctor stoppage)
|LOP: Chaos at the Casino 4
|
|align=center|2
|align=center|5:00
|Inglewood, California, United States
|
|-
|Win
|align=center|7–2
|Thor Skancke
|TKO (punches)
|LOP: Chaos at the Casino 3
|
|align=center|1
|align=center|1:27
|Inglewood, California, United States
|
|-
|Loss
|align=center|6–2
|Poppies Martinez
|Submission (guillotine choke)
|TPF 16: The Return
|
|align=center|1
|align=center|4:27
|Lemoore, California, United States
|
|-
|Win
|align=center|6–1
|Chris Tickle
|Submission (rear-naked choke)
|Flawless FC 3
|
|align=center|2
|align=center|2:32
|Inglewood, California, United States
|
|-
|Win
|align=center|5–1
|Joe Lewis
|TKO (punches)
|Samurai MMA Pro 4
|
|align=center|2
|align=center|1:12
|Culver City, California, United States
|
|-
|Loss
|align=center|4–1
|Jason Gonzales
|Submission (D'Arce choke)
|RITC
|
|align=center|2
|align=center|4:14
|Pomona, California, United States
|
|-
|Win
|align=center|4–0
|Joe Camacho
|Decision (unanimous)
|RITC
|
|align=center|3
|align=center|5:00
|Pomona, California, United States
|
|-
|Win
|align=center|3–0
|Chris Manzo
|KO (punch)
|RITC
|
|align=center|2
|align=center|4:07
|Pomona, California, United States
|
|-
|Win
|align=center|2–0
|Jose Alderete
|TKO (punches)
|Fury Fights 7
|
|align=center|3
|align=center|1:14
|Pomona, California, United States
|
|-
|Win
|align=center|1–0
|Dominic Gutierrez
|TKO (punches)
|John Pena Promotions 
|
|align=center|3
|align=center|5:00
|Pomona, California, United States
|
|-

See also
 List of current UFC fighters
 List of male mixed martial artists

References

External links

Living people
1990 births
American male mixed martial artists
Mixed martial artists utilizing wrestling
Mixed martial artists utilizing Brazilian jiu-jitsu
Mixed martial artists from California
American people of Greek descent
People from Azusa, California
Ultimate Fighting Championship male fighters
American practitioners of Brazilian jiu-jitsu